Zacharias Heinesen (born 1936 in Tórshavn) is a Faroese painter. He is the son of the writer and artist William Heinesen.

He attended Myndlistaskóli Íslands in Reykjavik between 1957 and 1958. In 1959–1963 he attended the Royal Danish Academy of Art in Copenhagen. In 1962, he returned to Tórshavn and established a hilltop studio overlooking the city and harbour. His works include oil paintings, watercolour paintings, drawings, woodcuts, lithographs and paper collages.

Through the years he has held a number of exhibitions and his paintings are to be found in several museums, including his 1987 painting Vár depicting a Faroese village in spring, which can be seen in the Listasavn Føroya (National Art Gallery) in Torshavn. In 1986 he was awarded the Henry Heerup prize.

His paintings were featured on a series of stamps in June 2001:

His work can also be seen on the 200 Faroese kronur bank note issues in 2004.
In 2006 he was honoured with the Faroese Cultural Prize.

See also 
 Faroese art

References

External links 
 The Faroe Islands National Art Museum-Zacharias Heinesen 

Living people
1936 births
Faroese painters
Royal Danish Academy of Fine Arts alumni
People from Tórshavn